Sir Timothy John Berners-Lee,  (born 8 June 1955), also known as TimBL, is an English computer scientist best known as the inventor of the World Wide Web. He is a professorial research fellow at the University of Oxford and a professor emeritus at the Massachusetts Institute of Technology (MIT). Berners-Lee proposed an information management system on 12 March 1989, then implemented the first successful communication between a Hypertext Transfer Protocol (HTTP) client and server via the Internet in mid-November.

Berners-Lee is the director of the World Wide Web Consortium (W3C), which oversees the continued development of the Web. He co-founded (with his then-wife-to-be Rosemary Leith) the World Wide Web Foundation. He is a senior researcher and holder of the 3Com founder's chair at the MIT Computer Science and Artificial Intelligence Laboratory (CSAIL). He is a director of the Web Science Research Initiative (WSRI) and a member of the advisory board of the MIT Center for Collective Intelligence. In 2011, he was named as a member of the board of trustees of the Ford Foundation. He is a founder and president of the Open Data Institute and is currently an advisor at social network MeWe.

He devised and implemented the first Web browser and Web server, and helped foster the Web's subsequent explosive development. He currently directs the W3 Consortium, developing tools and standards to further the Web's potential. In April 2009, he was elected as Foreign Associate of the National Academy of Sciences. 

In 2004, Berners-Lee was knighted by Queen Elizabeth II for his pioneering work. He was named in Time magazine's list of the 100 Most Important People of the 20th century and has received a number of other accolades for his invention. He was honoured as the "Inventor of the World Wide Web" during the 2012 Summer Olympics opening ceremony in which he appeared working with a vintage NeXT Computer. He tweeted "This is for everyone" which appeared in LED lights attached to the chairs of the audience. He received the 2016 Turing Award "for inventing the World Wide Web, the first web browser, and the fundamental protocols and algorithms allowing the Web to scale".

Early life and education
Berners-Lee was born on 8 June 1955 in London, England, the eldest of the four children of Mary Lee Woods and Conway Berners-Lee; his brother Mike is a professor of ecology and climate change management. His parents were computer scientists who worked on the first commercially built computer, the Ferranti Mark 1. He attended Sheen Mount Primary School, and then went on to attend south-west London's Emanuel School from 1969 to 1973, at the time a direct grant grammar school, which became an independent school in 1975. A keen trainspotter as a child, he learnt about electronics from tinkering with a model railway. He studied at The Queen's College, Oxford, from 1973 to 1976, where he received a first-class Bachelor of Arts degree in physics. While at university, Berners-Lee made a computer out of an old television set, which he bought from a repair shop.

Career and research

After graduation, Berners-Lee worked as an engineer at the telecommunications company Plessey in Poole, Dorset. In 1978, he joined D. G. Nash in Ferndown, Dorset, where he helped create typesetting software for printers.

Berners-Lee worked as an independent contractor at CERN from June to December 1980. While in Geneva, he proposed a project based on the concept of hypertext, to facilitate sharing and updating information among researchers. To demonstrate it, he built a prototype system named ENQUIRE.

After leaving CERN in late 1980, he went to work at John Poole's Image Computer Systems, Ltd, in Bournemouth, Dorset. He ran the company's technical side for three years. The project he worked on was a "real-time remote procedure call" which gave him experience in computer networking. In 1984, he returned to CERN as a fellow.

In 1989, CERN was the largest Internet node in Europe and Berners-Lee saw an opportunity to join hypertext with the Internet:

Berners-Lee wrote his proposal in March 1989 and, in 1990, redistributed it. It then was accepted by his manager, Mike Sendall, who called his proposals "vague, but exciting". Robert Cailliau had independently proposed a project to develop a hypertext system at CERN, and joined Berners-Lee as a partner in his efforts to get the web off the ground. They used similar ideas to those underlying the ENQUIRE system to create the World Wide Web, for which Berners-Lee designed and built the first web browser. His software also functioned as an editor (called WorldWideWeb, running on the NeXTSTEP operating system), and the first Web server, CERN HTTPd (short for Hypertext Transfer Protocol daemon).

Berners-Lee published the first web site, which described the project itself, on 20 December 1990; it was available to the Internet from the CERN network. The site provided an explanation of what the World Wide Web was, and how people could use a browser and set up a web server, as well as how to get started with your own website. On 6 August 1991, Berners-Lee first posted, on Usenet, a public invitation for collaboration with the WorldWideWeb project.

In a list of 80 cultural moments that shaped the world, chosen by a panel of 25 eminent scientists, academics, writers and world leaders, the invention of the World Wide Web was ranked number one, with the entry stating, "The fastest growing communications medium of all time, the Internet has changed the shape of modern life forever. We can connect with each other instantly, all over the world."

In 1994, Berners-Lee founded the W3C at the Massachusetts Institute of Technology. It comprised various companies that were willing to create standards and recommendations to improve the quality of the Web. Berners-Lee made his idea available freely, with no patent and no royalties due. The World Wide Web Consortium decided that its standards should be based on royalty-free technology, so that they easily could be adopted by anyone.

Berners-Lee participated in Curl Corp's attempt to develop and promote the Curl programming language.

In 2001, Berners-Lee became a patron of the East Dorset Heritage Trust, having previously lived in Colehill in Wimborne, East Dorset. In December 2004, he accepted a chair in computer science at the School of Electronics and Computer Science, University of Southampton, Hampshire, to work on the Semantic Web.

In a Times article in October 2009, Berners-Lee admitted that the initial pair of slashes ("//") in a web address were "unnecessary". He told the newspaper that he easily could have designed web addresses without the slashes. "There you go, it seemed like a good idea at the time," he said in his lighthearted apology.

Policy work

In June 2009, then-British prime minister Gordon Brown announced that Berners-Lee would work with the UK government to help make data more open and accessible on the Web, building on the work of the Power of Information Task Force. Berners-Lee and Professor Nigel Shadbolt are the two key figures behind data.gov.uk, a UK government project to open up almost all data acquired for official purposes for free reuse. Commenting on the opening up of Ordnance Survey data in April 2010, Berners-Lee said: "The changes signal a wider cultural change in government based on an assumption that information should be in the public domain unless there is a good reason not to—not the other way around." He went on to say: "Greater openness, accountability and transparency in Government will give people greater choice and make it easier for individuals to get more directly involved in issues that matter to them."

In November 2009, Berners-Lee launched the World Wide Web Foundation (WWWF) in order to campaign to "advance the Web to empower humanity by launching transformative programs that build local capacity to leverage the Web as a medium for positive change".

Berners-Lee is one of the pioneer voices in favour of net neutrality, and has expressed the view that ISPs should supply "connectivity with no strings attached", and should neither control nor monitor the browsing activities of customers without their expressed consent. He advocates the idea that net neutrality is a kind of human network right: "Threats to the Internet, such as companies or governments that interfere with or snoop on Internet traffic, compromise basic human network rights." Berners-Lee participated in an open letter to the US Federal Communications Commission (FCC). He and 20 other Internet pioneers urged the FCC to cancel a vote on 14 December 2017 to uphold net neutrality. The letter was addressed to Senator Roger Wicker, Senator Brian Schatz, Representative Marsha Blackburn and Representative Michael F. Doyle.

Berners-Lee joined the board of advisors of start-up State.com, based in London. As of May 2012, he is president of the Open Data Institute, which he co-founded with Nigel Shadbolt in 2012.

The Alliance for Affordable Internet (A4AI) was launched in October 2013 and Berners-Lee is leading the coalition of public and private organisations that includes Google, Facebook, Intel and Microsoft. The A4AI seeks to make Internet access more affordable so that access is broadened in the developing world, where only 31% of people are online. Berners-Lee will work with those aiming to decrease Internet access prices so that they fall below the UN Broadband Commission's worldwide target of 5% of monthly income.

Berners-Lee holds the founders chair in Computer Science at the Massachusetts Institute of Technology, where he heads the Decentralized Information Group and is leading Solid, a joint project with the Qatar Computing Research Institute that aims to radically change the way Web applications work today, resulting in true data ownership as well as improved privacy. In October 2016, he joined the Department of Computer Science at Oxford University as a professorial research fellow and as a fellow of Christ Church, one of the Oxford colleges.

From the mid 2010s Berners-Lee initially remained neutral on the emerging Encrypted Media Extensions (EME) proposal for with its controversial Digital Rights Management (DRM) implications. In March 2017 he felt he had to take a position which was to support the EME proposal.  He reasoned EME's virtues whilst noting DRM was inevitable. As W3C director, he went on to approve the finalised specification in July 2017. His stance was opposed by some including Electronic Frontier Foundation (EFF), the anti-DRM campaign Defective by Design and the Free Software Foundation. Varied concerns raised included being not supportive of the Internet's open philosophy against commercial interests and risks of users being forced to use a particular web browser to view specific DRM content. The EFF raised a formal appeal which did not succeed and the EME specification became a formal W3C recommendation in September 2017.

On 30 September 2018, Berners-Lee announced his new open-source startup Inrupt to fuel a commercial ecosystem around the Solid project, which aims to give users more control over their personal data and lets them choose where the data goes, who's allowed to see certain elements and which apps are allowed to see that data.

In November 2019 at the Internet Governance Forum in Berlin Berners-Lee and the WWWF launched Contract for the Web, a campaign initiative to persuade governments, companies and citizens to commit to nine principles to stop "misuse", with the warning that "if we don't act nowand act togetherto prevent the web being misused by those who want to exploit, divide and undermine, we are at risk of squandering [its potential for good]".

Awards and honours

Berners-Lee has received many awards and honours. He was knighted by Queen Elizabeth II in the 2004 New Year Honours "for services to the global development of the Internet", and was invested formally on 16 July 2004.

On 13 June 2007, he was appointed to the Order of Merit (OM), an order restricted to 24 (living) members. Bestowing membership of the Order of Merit is within the personal purview of the Queen and does not require recommendation by ministers or the Prime Minister. 

He was elected a Fellow of the Royal Society (FRS) in 2001. He was also elected as a member into the American Philosophical Society in 2004 and the National Academy of Engineering in 2007. 

He has been conferred honorary degrees from a number of universities around the world, including Manchester (his parents worked on the Manchester Mark 1 in the 1940s), Harvard and Yale.

In 2012, Berners-Lee was among the British cultural icons selected by artist Sir Peter Blake to appear in a new version of his most famous artwork – the Beatles' Sgt. Pepper's Lonely Hearts Club Band album cover – to celebrate the British cultural figures of his life that he most admires to mark his 80th birthday.

In 2013, he was awarded the inaugural Queen Elizabeth Prize for Engineering. On 4 April 2017, he received the 2016 ACM Turing Award "for inventing the World Wide Web, the first web browser, and the fundamental protocols and algorithms allowing the Web to scale".

Personal life
Berners-Lee has said "I like to keep work and personal life separate."

Berners-Lee married Nancy Carlson, an American computer programmer, in 1990. She was also working in Switzerland at the World Health Organization. They had two children and divorced in 2011. In 2014, he married Rosemary Leith at the Chapel Royal, St. James's Palace in London. Leith is a Canadian Internet and banking entrepreneur and a founding director of Berners-Lee's World Wide Web Foundation. The couple also collaborate on venture capital to support artificial intelligence companies.

Berners-Lee was raised as an Anglican, but he turned away from religion in his youth. After he became a parent, he became a Unitarian Universalist (UU). When asked whether he believes in God, he stated: "Not in the sense of most people, I'm atheist and Unitarian Universalist."

The web’s source code was auctioned by Sotheby’s in London during 23–30 June 2021, as a non-fungible token (NFT) by TimBL. Selling for USD $5,434,500, it was reported the proceeds would be used to fund initiatives by TimBL and his wife, Rosemary Leith.

References

Further reading
 Tim Berners-Lee's publications
 Tim Berners-Lee and the Development of the World Wide Web (Unlocking the Secrets of Science) (Mitchell Lane Publishers, 2001), 
 Tim Berners-Lee: Inventor of the World Wide Web (Ferguson's Career Biographies), Melissa Stewart (Ferguson Publishing Company, 2001),  children's biography
 How the Web was Born: The Story of the World Wide Web, Robert Cailliau, James Gillies, R. Cailliau (Oxford University Press, 2000), 
 Weaving the Web: The Original Design and Ultimate Destiny of the World Wide Web by Its Inventor, Tim Berners-Lee, Mark Fischetti (Paw Prints, 2008)
 "Man Who Invented the World Wide Web Gives it New Definition", Compute Magazine, 11 February 2011
 BBC2 Newsnight – Transcript of video interview of Berners-Lee on the read/write Web 
 Technology Review interview

External links

 
 
 
 Tim Berners-Lee on the W3C site
 List of Tim Berners-Lee publications on W3C site
 First World Wide Web page
 Interview with Tim Berners Lee
 
 

 
1955 births
Living people
People from Barnes, London
People educated at Emanuel School
Alumni of The Queen's College, Oxford
Academics of the University of Southampton
Fellows of Christ Church, Oxford
Members of the Department of Computer Science, University of Oxford
People associated with CERN
English computer scientists
English expatriates in the United States
English inventors
English Unitarians
Fellows of the American Academy of Arts and Sciences
Fellows of the British Computer Society
Fellows of The Queen's College, Oxford
Fellows of the Royal Academy of Engineering
Fellows of the Royal Society
Hypertext Transfer Protocol
Internet pioneers
Knights Commander of the Order of the British Empire
MacArthur Fellows
Massachusetts Institute of Technology faculty
Members of the Order of Merit
Foreign associates of the National Academy of Engineering
Turing Award laureates
Foreign associates of the National Academy of Sciences
Royal Medal winners
Semantic Web people
UNESCO Niels Bohr Medal recipients
Unitarian Universalists
Former Anglicans
Webby Award winners
World Wide Web Consortium
Recipients of the Order of the Cross of Terra Mariana, 1st Class
English atheists
MIT Computer Science and Artificial Intelligence Laboratory people
Members of the American Philosophical Society
Honorary Fellows of the British Academy
Royal Designers for Industry